Kathleen 'Kitty' Buckley is a former camogie player, five time All Ireland senior medalist and captain of the All Ireland Camogie Championship winning team in 1941. In the final of that year, she scored a record six goals of Cork's seven. She had previously featured on All Ireland senior final panels in 1934 (as a substitute), 1935, 1936, 1939, and 1940.

Career
With UCC, she won Ashbourne Cup medals in 1936 and 1937. She was a prolific goalscorer with both club and county, reportedly scoring nine goals for Cork in their 14–0 to 1–1 defeat of Clare in the first round of the championship on the week before Cusack Park, Ennis was opened in 1936, and scoring two goals in the All Ireland final of that year. She scored a goal in the 1938 final, in which Cork were beaten by Dublin, a further goal each in both the 1939 and 1940 finals when Cork beat Galway and in the 1942 replay when Cork lost to Dublin.

Other sports
She played inter-provincial tennis for Munster.

References

External links
 Camogie.ie Official Camogie Association Website
 Wikipedia List of Camogie players

Cork camogie players
Year of birth missing
Possibly living people
UCC camogie players